Elizeu Ferreira Marciano (born October 21, 1979 in Brazil) is a Brazilian football player

Club statistics

References

External links

Galo Digital

1979 births
Living people
Brazilian footballers
Criciúma Esporte Clube players
Joinville Esporte Clube players
Brazilian expatriate footballers
Expatriate footballers in Japan
J1 League players
J2 League players
Expatriate footballers in China
Yokohama FC players
Vegalta Sendai players
Tokushima Vortis players
Brazilian expatriate sportspeople in Japan
Chongqing Liangjiang Athletic F.C. players
Brazilian expatriate sportspeople in China
Association football defenders
Footballers from São Paulo